Get While the Gettin's Good is a studio album by American country singer-songwriter Bill Anderson. It was released in February 1967 on Decca Records and was produced by Owen Bradley. The project was Anderson's sixth studio album and included one single issued. The album itself reached peak positions on the Billboard country albums chart.

Background and content
Get While the Gettin's Good was recorded in November 1966 at Bradley's Barn, a studio located in Mount Juliet, Tennessee. Bradley's Barn was owned by the album's producer, Owen Bradley. Anderson had been recording with Bradley since his beginnings at the Decca label in the late 1950s. This would be their sixth studio album together. The album consisted of 12 tracks that were previously unrecorded. Five of the album's tunes were composed by Anderson, including the title track. Among these songs was "Bad Seed", which had recently become a major country hit for Jan Howard. Other songs were cover versions of songs previously recorded by others. The third track, "A Satisfied Mind", had been previously recorded by Porter Wagoner and Jean Shepard respectively. "Ride, Ride, Ride" was first cut by Lynn Anderson. A third track, "Open Up Your Heart", had first been recorded by Buck Owens.

Release and reception

Get While the Gettin's Good was released in February 1967 on Decca Records. The album was released as a vinyl record, with six songs on both sides of the project. The record peaked at number eight on the Billboard Top Country Albums chart on April 15, 1967, becoming Anderson's fifth studio album to reach the top ten on that chart.

The album included one single which was the title track. The title track was released a month prior to the album, January 1967. By March 1967, the single had peaked at number five on the Billboard Hot Country Singles chart, becoming Anderson's twelfth top ten hit on that chart. Following its release, the album would be reviewed by Allmusic. They gave the project three out of five possible stars.

Track listing

Personnel
All credits are adapted from the liner notes of I Love You Drops.

Musical personnel
 Bill Anderson – lead vocals
 Harold Bradley – guitar
 Ray Edenton – guitar
 Roy Huskey – bass
 The Jordanaires – background vocals
 Jimmy Lance – guitar
 Grady Martin – guitar
 Len Miller – drums
 Hargus "Pig" Robbins – piano
 Hal Rugg – steel guitar
 Jerry Shook – guitar
 Jerry Smith – piano

Technical personnel
 Owen Bradley – record producer
 Hal Buksbaum – photography

Chart performance

Release history

References

1967 albums
Albums produced by Owen Bradley
Bill Anderson (singer) albums
Decca Records albums